Arise Church is a New Zealand Pentecostal church. It is a multi-campus church, with twelve locations throughout New Zealand.

History

Origins and expansion
Originally named City Church Wellington, it was founded in 2002 with seven people in a small dance and drama studio in Wellington. John and Gillian Cameron were the lead pastors of Arise Church. Arise Church has since expanded to include campuses in seven physical locations across New Zealand including Wellington, Hutt Valley (Arise Centre), Hamilton, Whangarei, Kapiti, Palmerston North, Christchurch, and Dunedin, with services based at the Wellington and Hutt Valley campuses also being streamed online. In May 2019 it was announced that Arise would be launching their 9th campus, in Auckland, in 2021, where they began preview services as of February 2021.

Arise Church has also established two conferences across the year, Passionate Women's Conference and Arise Conference. Passionate Women's Conference has close to 2,300 delegates and boasts world-renowned speakers like Lisa Bevere, Leanne Mattesius, Perscilla Schrier and many more. The second is Arise Conference where the whole of Arise Church gathers together once a year to celebrate and encourage the Church of New Zealand as a whole body.

According to Paul Morris, Professor of Religious Studies at Victoria University, Arise is part of a "religious revival" in New Zealand's youth culture.  Radio New Zealand's youth channel, The Wireless, compared Arise to Australia's Hillsong Church, and other papers have described Arise as having, "a big youth following".  The Church responded to the 2011 Christchurch earthquake with immediate shipments of shelf-stable food to the devastated city.

2022 internal problems

Internship exploitation allegations
In mid April 2022, several ex-members alleged that Arise Church used unpaid volunteer labour excessively, that interns were made to pay in order to take part in internships, and students were encouraged to donate portions of their student loans to the church. In response to these allegations, Pastors John and Brent Cameron temporarily resigned from their pastoral duties and Arise's governing board pending an internal review.

In mid-May 2022, independent journalist David Farrier and Radio New Zealand reported that former members had alleged that Brent Cameron bullied interns and had stripped naked in front of one. This behaviour had allegedly occurred during Arise church’s annual tour of other New Zealand churches.  It was alleged that this member received a confidential payout to ensure their non-disclosure of Cameron's behaviour. Another former staff member claimed that Pastor John Cameron was more concerned with financial donations than the well-being of church members.  In response to the allegations, an independent investigation was commissioned. By 16 May, at least 190 people had contacted the team conducting an internal review of Arise Church.

In late May 2022, Arise Church's board confirmed that Pastors John and Gillian along with Brent had formally resigned from the church's leadership in the wake of the exploitation and bullying allegations. In addition, Radio New Zealand reported that Arise Church had made confidential payouts to interns who had reported allegations of bullying and inappropriate behaviour by both Brent and John.

Pathfinding report
In mid July 2022, Radio New Zealand reported that the Employment Relations Authority (ERA) had imposed a temporary non-publication order on an external review of Arise Church conducted by independent consultancy firm Pathfinding. Both former members and Arise Church's leadership board expressed frustration with the delay in the report's release. Several former church members who spoke to Arise Church made allegations about bullying, unpaid labour, and homophobia. ERA indicated that it would review its temporary non-publication order later in the month. 

On 16 August 2022, Farrier and Radio New Zealand obtained a leaked copy of Pathfinding's independent review of Arise Church. Pathfinding's report drew upon 545 submissions by former and current members and included allegations about sexual misconduct, racism, homophobia, body shaming, sexism, pastors forcing their political views on members, distrust of medical treatments, bullying, ageism, exploitation of interns, people being forced to work despite injuries, and financial mismanagement. Pathfinding made 92 recommendations including making a genuine apology for the hurt caused to members, reporting illegal activities to the authorities, paying for former members to receive counselling, engaging a restorative justice facilitator, disavowing conversion therapy, promoting Māori church leadership, an independent review of the church finances, and replacing the entire leadership board. Pathfinding review member Reverend Frank Ritchie attributed the church's problems to centralised power, honour culture, its business practices, performance culture, and so-called "toxic positivity."

According to Stuff and TVNZ, Arise had attempted to prevent the report's 92 recommendations from being released publicly, leading to ERA's temporary non-publication order on the document in July 2022. However, the order was subsequently rescinded following the report's leakage by Farrier and Radio New Zealand, a teleconference held on 17 August between John and Gillian Cameron and ERA, and pressure from TVNZ. In a public statement, Arise church claimed that the report was not an "investigative process" but rather a tool to gather information in order to inform changes to church policies and practices.

Repercussions
On 18 August 2022, the Department of Internal Affairs's Charities Services division commenced an investigation of Arise Church in response to the issues raised by the Pathfinding report. On 21 August 2022, two board members Kylie Fletcher and Ben Kendrew apologised to those members who had experienced hurt and promised change. Their apology did not mention Pathfinding's recommendations.

In January 2023, the Ministry of Business, Innovation and Employment (MBIE) issued Arise Church's leadership board with an infringement notice for failing to maintain proper wages, time, holiday, and leave records for migrant employees. By 7 March, seven board members including senior pastor Ben Kendrew, John Robertson, Joseph Bundy-Cooke, Alistair Papali'i-Curtin, Anna Pasikale, Alice Camaivuna and Kylie Fletcher were banned from recruiting migrant workers until 16 July as a result of MBIE's investigation.

In mid February 2023, the Otago University Students' Association (OUSA) excluded Arise Church from its Orientation Week's Tent City following allegations of racism, sexual assault, homophobia, and labour exploitation in 2022.

Departure of Auckland campus
In mid-October 2022, Arise Board and Leadership announced the resignation of Auckland campus pastors Ben Carroll and Anna Carroll and the closure of their church campus. The Carrolls intend to start with the former Auckland congregation rebranded as "Passion - AKL"..

Beliefs and theology
Arise professes to adhere to a form of Christian theology that mostly resembles Pentecostalism. They make the following affirmations as the fundamental tenets of their faith:
 We believe that the Bible is the inspired Word of God
 We believe in one God, who has revealed Himself in three persons – Father, Son and Holy Spirit
 We believe in the virgin birth, sinless life, miraculous ministry, substitutional death of Jesus Christ, His resurrection, His ascension into heaven and His second coming to bring everyone to account for their lives
 We believe in the fall of man and his separation from God through sin
 We believe in salvation through faith in Christ who died for our sins and was raised for our peace with God and victory in the life He gives. Through His blood we have redemption
 We believe in water baptism
 We believe that the baptism in the Holy Spirit is an essential part of the Christian experience, designed to empower for service and witness
 We believe that our primary vision is to become like Jesus in all that we think, say and do
 We believe that deliverance from the devil's authority, selfish habits and oppression is provided through the death and resurrection of Jesus Christ
 We believe in both heaven and hell and that faith in the good news of Christ makes all of the difference

Activities and views
Arise Wellington now holds services every weekend in the largest indoor venues in the city, worshipping in the Michael Fowler Centre, TSB Bank Arena, and the St. James Theatre with close to 7,000 people meeting across 4 services in the Wellington Region it is the largest in Wellington.

Arise Centre
The Arise Centre is a multi-purpose auditorium and function venue built by Arise Church with a 1,200-seat purpose-built auditorium, 500 square metre foyer and café, 400 square metres of auxiliary rooms and 1,200 square metres of office space on level 2.

In 2015, the Church entered the permitting process for construction for the Petone building, which includes both worship and office space.

Arise Conference
Arise Conference has become the main conference for the church. Beginning as a camp in 2004 and then with the ever-increasing size of Arise Church it became a conference. 

In 2013 it was announced that from 2014, Arise Conference would take over running the Get Smart Youth Conference from LIFE Church Auckland. From 2014 Arise conference ran as 3 conferences in one with a Kids Conference and The Get Smart Youth Conference becoming the two additions. In 2017, Arise Conference was held in 2 venues.

In 2019, Arise Conference held a conference in a second city, Christchurch.

Due to the COVID-19 Pandemic, the decision was made to cancel Arise Conference in both cities in 2020, and to revert to a single conference location in Wellington in 2021, due to take place at TSB Arena in July 2021.

Pathway and values
In 2017 Arise Church ventured into a new way of discipleship for current and new members of the church, which was revised in 2020. This entails a 3-week (previously 4-week) pathway program where attendees go through a process of understanding more about the faith, about their role in God's plan and advancing God's church. These four weeks are listed below and they begin on the second Sunday of every month, with the first Sunday holding a Welcome Party for new members to meet local campus leaders.

 Know God - Know Life: discovering who God is and what it takes to become a part of the journey of faith in Jesus, living life as a Christian, sharing faith, and living with the hope of Jesus.
 Discover purpose: discovering one's spiritual gifts and becoming a part of the community of Arise with one's giftings.
 Make a difference: connection into the life of Arise Church and developing community through servanthood and establishing the values of the A-Team in one's life.

Evangelism in schools
Arise Church has been accused of various attempts to engage in preaching in public schools, which some argue contravenes legislation which states that teaching in New Zealand schools must be secular during school hours. A former member of the Arise Church, Josh Barley  has raised concerns about some of the methods they use, particularly in targeting youth, as well as their ideology.  His observations are detailed in his blog.

Conversion therapy
In August 2021, Arise advocated for a proposed ban on conversion therapy in New Zealand but with amendments, alleging that it criminalised parents, counsellors and pastors seeking to help children and young people dealing with sexuality or gender issues.

In September 2021, an article came out accusing Arise of misinterpreting the Bill and causing confusion.

References

External links
Arise Church official website

Christian organizations established in 2002
Pentecostal churches in New Zealand
Pentecostal denominations in Oceania
Organisations based in Wellington
Christian denominations in New Zealand